Forsaken World (commonly abbreviated as FW), is a 3D adventure and fantasy MMORPG with traditional Chinese settings, developed by Perfect World Entertainment's Beijing studio. Players can take on various roles depending on choice of race and choice of class within that race.

The series is a spin-off of Perfect World Entertainment's flagship 2005 game Perfect World, and the title is based on it.

Seasons
The game has gone through a series of several subtitles:
War of Shadows, as of 12 December 2012
Blood Harvest, as of 9 July 2014
Vengeance, as of 12 January 2016
Homecoming, as of 13 January 2017
Exordium, as of 1 January 2018
Voyage, as of 12 January 2019
Sleepless Carnival, as of 6 January 2021
Gods and Demons, as of 10 September 2021

Closure
On 22 April 2022 there was an announcement that the servers would be closed (deleting all the characters) by 30 November 2022. Purchases were disabled April 28, with all March/April purchases converted into Arc credit for other games. Purchases from February and earlier would not be refunded.

References

2012 video games
Active massively multiplayer online games
Massively multiplayer online role-playing games
Video games developed in China
Windows games
Windows-only games